Evangeline Anderson-Rajkumar is a feminist activist ecumenical theologian who taught at Serampore College, Serampore (1990-1994) the United Theological College, Bangalore, (1999-2014). Evangeline Anderson-Rajkumar was the first permanent woman faculty to serve as faculty in the Theology Department of the renowned Serampore College, founded by William Carey when he came to India in 1792. She was the first Lutheran Woman to serve as first Vice President of the United Evangelical Lutheran Churches in India in 2006. She comes from a family of theologians  - about 17 of them, her father, all eight siblings, and seven of the eight who married into the family. Evangeline Anderson-Rajkumar served as the President of the Association of Theologically Trained Women of India (ATTWI) and is a sought after resource person on Body Theology.

Writings
 Practicing Gender Justice as a Faith Mandate in India, Studies in World Christianity, triannual, Edinburgh University Press, April 2007, Volume 13, pp. 33–52, ISSN 1354-9901.
 Dear God, Reveal Your Name!, The God of All Grace:  Essays in Honour of O. V. Jathanna, Edited by Joseph George, Asian Trading Corporation, Bangalore, 2005.  , 
 Engendering Leadership: A Christian feminist Perspective from India, in Responsible Leadership, Edited by Christoph Stückelberger and J.N.K. Mugambi pp. 168, Action Publishers, Nairobi, 2005.
 Women’s  Movements  in  Mission:  Some  lessons  for  the  Church  Today, Re-routing Mission: Towards A People’s Concept of Mission, Chraistava Sahitya Samithi, Tiruvalla, April 2004, pp. 39–60.
 New  Eyes, New  Reading, New Woman…, Feminist Hermeneutics,  Edited by  Lalrinawmi Ralte and Evangeline Anderson-Rajkumar, IWIT/ISPCK, New Delhi, 2002, pp. 102–114.  , .
 Mission  from a Dalit Perspective, Mission Paradigm  in  the New Millennium, Edited by W. S. Milton Jeganathan, Indian Society for the Promotion of Christian Knowledge, New Delhi, 2000, pp. 296–304.
 Gender and Identity in Envisioning a New Heaven and a New Earth, Edited by Rini Ralte and others, Indian Society for the Promotion of Christian Knowledge, New Delhi, 1999.
 William Carey's Mission of Compassion and Justice, Carey's Obligation and India's Renaissance, Edited by J.T.K. Daniel and Roger E. Hedlund, Council of Serampore College, Serampore, First published 1993 and reprinted in 2005, pp. 323–333.
 “Turning the Body inside out” in Dalit Theology of the 21st century. Ed. Sathianathan Clarke, Philip Peacock and Deenabandhu Manchala, Oxford Publications, Delhi, 2010.
 “The Violence of Silence:  Reviewing the Church’s stance on the issue of Domestic Violence” in Asian Christian Review,
 "Engaging the dis-ease of silence and passivity in church and society: New energy from rereading the Bible through a gender lens." In In love with the Bible and its ordinary readers: Hans de Wit and the intercultural Bible reading project, edited by Hans Snoek. Elkhart, IN: Institute of Mennonite Studies, 2015, pp. 
 “Womb: Is it inside or Outside? Reflections on the issue of Women renting their wombs” in The Yobel Spring. Vol 1 eds. Praveen PS Perumalla, et al., ACTC &ISPCK, Delhi, 2013, pp. 239–248.

Early days
Evangeline Anderson-Rajkumar was born on 19 March 1963 in Bangalore. She is the third daughter in a family of eight siblings, (six sisters + two brothers) and all eight siblings completed their theological education and entered various forms of ministry. Acts 1: 8  "Be my Witnesses" is the under-girding Bible verse that motivates the whole family to witness to a loving and gracious triune God who sustained them in days of hardship and despair. Faith in God is therefore the richest resource that the family is endowed with, making the millionaires in faith to the rest of the world to state that God is a living and an ever present God, active in history, in everyone's lives. 
The neighborhood where Evangeline lived (The Jeremiah Road Neighborhood) is yet another large family comprising at least twenty families, belonging to all faiths: Hindu, Muslim, Jain, Christian, and those who were from different culture, caste, color and faith orientations. That this friendship and comradeship remains alive and vibrant even today after thirty – forty years speaks of the quality of relationship fostered in that neighborhood community.
She went to Goodwill's Girls School and later joined Mount Carmel College, Bangalore where she obtained a BSc degree in the year 1983.

Studies in divinity
Evangeline Anderson-Rajkumar’s father stands as THE person who influenced her most, in her personal and faith formation. How do those parents who have faced difficult moments in their own lives, convert those experiences into faith and commit themselves to building a positive family, neighborhood,

In the year 1984, Anderson-Rajkumar joined the United Theological College, Bengaluru and enrolled herself for pursuing the degree of Bachelor of Divinity (BD).  She later left for Sweden in the year 1987 and pursued a one-year programme of the Church of Sweden in Göteborg.

Research studies and lecturership

Post-graduate
Anderson-Rajkumar later returned to India in 1988 and pursued the degree of Master of Theology M. Th. in the discipline of theology in the Tamil Nadu Theological Seminary, Madurai and completed it by 1990.

Lecturership
Serampore College, the constituent college of the Senate of Serampore College, Serampore, West Bengal invited her to be on its faculty.  Accepting the offer, Anderson-Rajkumar left for Serampore in the year 1990 and taught Theology and Ethics. She later left for doctoral studies to Bengaluru in 1994.

Doctoral studies
Later, Anderson-Rajkumar enrolled as a doctoral candidate at the South Asia Theological Research Institute (SATHRI) in Bengaluru and earned the doctoral degree of Doctor of Theology (Th.D.) in the discipline of Feminist Theology.

Professorship
The United Theological College, Bengaluru, Anderson-Rajkumar's alma mater invited Anderson-Rajkumar to join as a member of its faculty.  Since then, Anderson-Rajkumar had been teaching theology to the students there.

Resource person

The Institute of the Blessed Virgin Mary
Sisters of Loreto was founded by Mary Ward who have their Indian provincialate in Kolkata.  They descended in India in the year 1842 and have their presence entirely in North India. Anderson-Rajkumar was invited in the years 2002 and 2003 to take up talks on re-reading the Bible.

Dharmararam Vidya Kshetram
Dharmaram Vidya Kshetram, Bengaluru is a pontifical atheneum with degree-granting authority validated by the Vatican. Anderson-Rajkumar also taught gender issues to the students there.

Federation of Asian Bishops Conference
In 2004, Anderson-Rajkumar delivered talks on Asian Feminist Christology at the Federation of Asian Bishop's Conferences in Bangkok, Thailand.

Anderson-Rajkumar on issues

on poverty

Membership

Association of Theologically Trained Women of India
The Association of Theologically Trained Women of India (ATTWI), constituted in 1979 has a membership base of more than 500.  Anderson-Rajkumar is a member of ATTWI and provided leadership to this ecumenical association from 2002 to 2006 as President of ATTWI.

Women's Institute for New Awakening
The Women's Institute for New Awakening (WINA) founded in 1982 in Karnataka. Anderson-Rajkumar has been serving as the Vice-President of WINA since the year 2000.

Indian Theological Association
Anderson-Rajkumar is a member of the Indian Theological Association (ITA) which meets every year.  ITA was established in the year 1976 by Fr. Joseph Constantine Manalel. In the recent annual conference of the ITA held in Bengaluru on the theme Women's Concerns and Indian Theological Responses, a 34 recommendations were arrived upon.

Globethics.net
Globethics.net, a network of institutions involved in applied ethics headquartered in Geneva, Switzerland was founded in 2004 by the ethicist Prof. Dr. Christoph Stückelberger.  Anderson-Rajkumar was a board member of Globethics.net Association from 2004 to 2008. Since 2009, Globethics.net is a foundation with a new board.

Senate of Serampore College
The Senate of Serampore College (University) (India's first University with degree-granting authority) took note of Anderson-Rajkumar's activism and made her a member on its Academic Council in the year 2005.  She earlier served as a member on the Board of Studies for Theology and Ethics under the Board of Theological Education of the Senate of Serampore College (BTESSC), the regulatory body for theological education in India, from 2000 to 2003.

Anderson-Rajkumar is also the present Convenor of Board of Women's Studies of the BTESSC.

References
Notes

Further reading
 

1963 births
Living people
Indian feminists
Indian Christian theologians
Feminist studies scholars
Gender studies academics
Christian feminist theologians
Senate of Serampore College (University) alumni
Academic staff of the Senate of Serampore College (University)
Mount Carmel College, Bangalore alumni
Scholars from Bangalore
Educators from Karnataka
Women educators from Karnataka
20th-century Indian educational theorists
Indian women educational theorists
20th-century Indian social scientists
Women Christian clergy
20th-century women educators